Marasanapalli is a small village in Srinivasapur taluk of Kolar district in Karnataka, India.

Villages in Kolar district